Aleksandar Kitić (born 26 August 1983) is a Bosnian-Herzegovinian footballer who plays for the Swedish football club Ljungskile SK as a midfielder.

References

External links
 Profile - Svensk Fotboll

1983 births
Living people
Association football midfielders
Bosnia and Herzegovina footballers
FK Kozara Gradiška players
FK Radnik Bijeljina players
Ljungskile SK players
Allsvenskan players
Superettan players
Bosnia and Herzegovina expatriate footballers
Expatriate footballers in Sweden
Bosnia and Herzegovina expatriate sportspeople in Sweden